Juan Carlos Fábrega (born January 10, 1949) is an Argentine banker. He does not have a university degree, and worked at Banco Nación for 45 years. He was appointed president of the Central Bank of Argentina in November 2013, by president Cristina Fernández de Kirchner. On October 1, 2014, he resigned his office.

References

Presidents of the Central Bank of Argentina
Living people
1949 births